Olmstedville is a hamlet in the town of Minerva in Essex County, New York, United States, in Adirondack Park.

Historically, it has been the largest settlement in the town of Minerva. Today, it has its own post office (ZIP Code 12857) and Minerva Central School is located there. One of two stations of Minerva Fire & Rescue is also located in Olmstedville. The community still remains as the largest hamlet in the town. Telephone service is provided by the 518-251 exchange in North Creek.

Olmstedville was the home of Wesley Barnes, who, as a member of the New York State Assembly, sponsored the resolution creating the New York State Forest Preserve in 1885.  It was also home to Francis Donnelly, who, at the time of his death in 1980, was the longest continually serving town elected official in the United States, having served as the Town of Minerva Supervisor and as that town's representative at the county level for 46 years.

References

Hamlets in New York (state)
Hamlets in Essex County, New York